Roopa (Hindi: रूपा) is a female given name in many languages of India, which means "blessed with beauty". Roopa may refer to:

Notable people named Roopa
D. Roopa, Indian police officer
Roopa (actress) (born 1960), South Indian actress.
Roopa Farooki (born 1974), British writer.
Roopa Ganguly (born 1966), Indian actress, playback singer and politician.
Roopa Iyer (born 1985), Indian film director, actor, dancer, choreographer, model and businesswoman.
Roopa Nagraj (born 1983), Emirati cricketer.
Roopa Pai (date of birth missing), Indian computer engineer, journalist and children's author 
Roopa Ram (born 1954), Indian politician, member of Bharatiya Janata Party.
Roopa Rao (born 1981), Indian director.
Roopa Revathi (born 1984), Indian playback singer and violinist.
Roopa Sree (born 1970), Indian film and television actress.
Roopa Unnikrishnan (date of birth missing), Indian-born American sports shooter.

See also
Rupa

Hindu given names
Indian feminine given names